Soy Yo (Eng.: It's Me) is the fifth studio album by Spanish singer Marta Sánchez. It was released on July 16, 2002 and achieved gold status in Spain in the first week of sales. Was recorded in Madrid, Spain, London, UK and Los Angeles, CA. The first single in Spain was "Sigo Intentado" a ballad written by the singer and dedicated to her sister. In Mexico the first single was "Soy Yo", a dance song written by Paul Berry and Mark Taylor with a translation by the singer herself. Was produced by Carl James, Gary Miller, Carlo Nasi, Brian Rawling and once again by Christian De Walden.

Track listing

Certifications and sales

References

Marta Sánchez albums
2002 albums
Albums produced by Brian Rawling